Zuoquan County is a county in the east of Shanxi Province of China, bordering Hebei Province to the east. It is under the administration of the prefecture-level city of Jinzhong.

After Communist general Zuo Quan was killed in action during World War II, the CCP renamed the Liao County in Shanxi Province to Zuoquan County, in his honor.

Climate

References

External links
www.xzqh.org 

 
County-level divisions of Shanxi
Jinzhong